Kolodiivka is a village in Kamianets-Podilskyi Raion (district) of Khmelnytskyi Oblast in western Ukraine. It belongs to Kytaihorod rural hromada, one of the hromadas of Ukraine. The village's population was 1,042 as of the 2001 Ukrainian census.

The village maintains its own local government as the Kolodiivka Rural Council, which consists of 21 locally elected deputies.

References

Villages in Kamianets-Podilskyi Raion